The European Society for the History of Photography (ESHPh), founded in 1978, is a society concerned with the historical events within photography from a European perspective.

The ESHPh publicly hosts symposia, publishes journals, and distributes the "International Letter" to its members. The ESHPh is actively chronicling the historiography of the history of photography in Europe.

History
The founding of the Europäischen Gesellschaft für die Geschichte der Photographie (ESHPh) [European Society for the History of Photography] took place at the first general meeting on 19 November 1978 in Leverkusen, Germany. The decision to form a society of this nature had been taken one year earlier in Antwerp, Belgium. A group of museum curators and photographic historians from six European countries - notably Laurent Roosens (of the Sterckshof Museum, Antwerp), Margaret Harker (the UK's Royal Photographic Society) and Rolf Krauss (German Society for Photography) - came together to establish a new society dealing with the history of photography in a European context.

Since 2001, the presidential headquarters are to be found in Vienna. From 1978 until 1989, those headquarters were in Antwerp; thereafter, until 2001, in Croydon, UK. It is currently based in Vienna, although the website is hosted by the Donau University Krems, Austria.

The aims of the ESHPh
The ESHPh was founded with the primary aim of researching the historical development of photography from its origins up to the present and integrating it within a European context within the social political matrix of photography's inherent interdisciplinary nature. Photographers, general historians and historians of photography, philosophers, sociologists, ethnologists, academics, curators and private collectors as well as many important European institutions and some from further afield all belong to the ESHPh. Alongside its research activities, the ESHPh takes part in a worldwide exchange of information. It supports both the recognition of the history of photography as an academic discipline and the establishment of chairs in the discipline at European universities.

From 1981 until 2004, the society has held symposia in various locations in Europe, as evidenced by diverse publications. For its 30th anniversary in 2008, the ESHPh celebrated an internationally attended photography congress at the Austrian Academy of Sciences, in Vienna, from 6–8 November 2008. This anniversary event was accompanied by an English language commemorative publication and took place as the theoretical focus of the European Month of Photography 2008 in Vienna.

The ESHPh as a society was entered in the Austrian Register of Societies on 3 March 2004. However, the seat of society is connected to the presidency.

The first general meeting, at which the board was elected, took place on 8 June in the WestLicht Gallery in Vienna. The new Executive Committee of the ESHPh was elected at the Society's annual general assembly that was held in Vienna on 4 November 2010, at the invitation of the Department for Pictures at the Austrian National Library.

ESHPh board (as of 2011)
Mag. Uwe Schögl – President
Dr. Ulla Fischer-Westhauser – Vice-president

International advisory board
Hans Christian Adam, picture research, photo consulting (Göttingen, Germany)
Professor Anna Auer, photo historian (Vienna, Austria)
A. D. Coleman, photography critic (New York City, USA)
Professor Alistair Crawford, artist and writer (Sudbury/Suffolk, United Kingdom)
Rolf H. Krauss (Stuttgart, Germany)
Liz Wells (Plymouth, United Kingdom)

Activities
The International Letter is sent to members twice a year; the letter is a summary of recent events and information of new events and symposia concerning photography across the world, and also includes exhibition notices and auctions.

Symposia
Since 1981, the society has brought together practitioners and specialists with the aim of discussing photography and to create contacts from a variety of disciplines relating to photography.
2012 Vienna (A)
The Material and Immaterial in Photography
2nd Congress of Photography in Vienna at the MUSA
24 November 2012
Felderstraße 6-8, 1010 Vienna
2008 Vienna (A) 22nd International Symposium
The 30 Years Jubilee of ESHPh
1st Congress of Photography in Vienna at the Austrian Academy of Sciences (Theatre-Hall)
6–8 November 2008
Sonnenfelsgasse 19, 1010 Vienna
2004 Stockholm (S) 21st International Symposium
From Nordic Landscapes to North American Indians Current Trends in Nordic and International History of Photography
9–10 September 2004 at the National Library of Sweden and Moderna Museet, Stockholm
2003 Mannheim (D) 20th International Symposium
Helmut Gernsheim Reconsidered
12 October 2003 at the Museum of Anthropology and Natural History (Reiss-Engelhorn Museen), Mannheim
2002 Maastricht (NL) 19th International Symposium
BOXED
11–13 November 2002 at the Academy of Visual Art, Hogeschool Zuyd, Maastricht, Netherlands
2001 Vienna (A) 18th International Symposium
Photography and Research in Austria – Vienna, the Door to the European East
20–22 June 2001 at the Austrian National Library in Vienna 
2000 Bradford (UK) 17th International Symposium
Retracing the Image: The Emergence of Photography in the Nineteenth Century
16–17 June 2000 at the Museum for Photography, Film & Television, Bradford, UK
1999 Udine (I) 16th International Symposium
Photography in Italy
5–8 May 1999 at the University of Udine, Italy
1998 Antwerpen (B) 15th International Symposium
20 Years of European Society for the History of Photography
8–11 January 1998 at the Congrescentrum‘t Elzenveld, Antwerp, Belgium
1997 Helsinki (FIN) 14th International Symposium
Finland Shamanism and Beliefs in Europe Photography
9–12 October 1997 at Hanasaari (The Swedish - Finnish Cultural Centre), Helsinki, Finland
1997 Brussels (B) 13th International Symposium
Photoresearcher ESHPh
18 April 1997 at the Free University Brussels, in collaboration with Higher Institute for Fine Arts and ESHPh Belgium, Brussels, Belgium
Essays third symposium 'Image & University' - Philosophy of photography
1996 Charleroi (B) 12th International Symposium
Questioning the World
25–28 April 1996 at the Museum of Photographie, Charleroi, Belgium
1994 Oslo (N) 11th International Symposium
25–28 August 1994 at Lysebu Conference Centre, Oslo, Norway
1993 Vilanova (E) 10th International Symposium
28–30 June 1993 at the Town-Hall of Vilanova i la Geltrú, Barcelona, Spain
1992 Edinburgh (UK) 9th International Symposium
Photography 1900
In association of The Scottish Society for the History of Photography
24–26 September 1992 at the National Museum of Scotland, Edinburgh
1992 London, (UK) 8th International Symposium
The changing Role of Photography in Advertising & Fashion
30 May 1992 at the National Portrait Gallery, London
1991 Toulouse (F) 7th International Symposium
27–29 June 1991 at the Galerie du Château d'eau, Toulouse, France
1989 Göteborg (SE) 6th International Symposium
28 September – 1 October 1989 at the Department of Design and Crafts, Gothenburg, Sweden
1989 Vevey (CH) 5th International Symposium
150th Anniversary of the Invention of Photography
29 June – 2 July 1989 at the Centre Doret, Vevey, Switzerland
1988 Antwerpen (B) 4th International Symposium
10 Years Jubilee of the ESHPh
23–25 September 1988 at the Provinciaal Museum voor Fotografie, Antwerp, Belgium
1985 Bradford (UK) 3rd International Symposium
11–14 April 1985 at the Museum for Photography, Film & Television, Bradford, UK
1982 Antwerpen (B) 2nd International Symposium
5 June 1982 at the Crédit Communal de Belgique, Brussels
1981 Bath (UK) 1st International Symposium
9–12 April 1981 at the Royal York Hotel, Bath, UK

Publications

PhotoResearcher
The society's printed journal, PhotoResearcher, has been published since 1990. 2010 saw the journal published three times a year by contributing authors who are internationally recognised experts in the field of photography.

No. 12 onwards:
Co-editors: Uwe Schögl and Ulla Fischer-Westhauser

No's. 7–11 (2004–2008)
Co-editors: Anna Auer, Vienna (A), Alistair Crawford, Aberystwyth (UK).

No. 6 (1994–1996)
Editorial: Alistair Crawford, University of Wales, School of Arts, Aberystwyth (UK).

No. 5 (1993)
Editorial: Margaret Harker Farrand, Roy Green (UK).

No's. 1–4 (1990–1992)
Editorial board: Margaret Harker Farrand, Roy Green, Anthony Hamber, Sidney F. Ray (UK).

30 years of ESHPh 2008
This jubilee publication coincided with the 2008 conference in Vienna. It served to formulise the direction of the ESHPh and give an overview of the "picture" from trans-disciplinarian perspectives.

Photohistorica
Photohistorica: Serial Literature Index of the European Society for the History of Photography consisted of a bibliographical listing, with abstracts, of articles that had appeared in serial publications of the relevant years of publication. The first issue in May 1978 was a bibliographic listing only, but thereafter most bibliographic entries were accompanied by a short abstract. Apart from that pioneering issue of May 1978, each issue was double-numbered (such as 02/03) and except for 1979 and 1981 two double-numbered issues appeared annually (i.e. covering 1992 the two issues were numbers 50/51 and 52/53 containing abstract No.s 6656-6963 and 8964-7229). Karel van Deuren (the editor throughout the 1980s), Dr. Laurent Roosens (inaugural President of ESHPh), and Luc Salu (librarian of the Museum voor Fotographie, Antwerp) were the first compilers of the bibliography and abstracts. The production of those twenty–seven double-numbered issues of Photohistorica of 1978-1992 made possible in Belgium by annual grants provided until 1993 by Agfa–Gevaert. From the remaining funds provided by Agfa-Gevaert, a detailed Cumulative Index was sent out to members of ESHPh in mid–1994.

For some years, the office of the ESHPh (under the society's President Prof. Margaret Harker Farrand) was based in England, and 1993-94 witnessed two years of financial insecurity for the Society, with an income apparently limited solely to the subscriptions of its members. Yet the production of a bibliography of articles on the history of photography from current serials had been of undoubted value and a justified function of the ESHPh. After a lapse of two years, a new volunteer - R. Derek Wood (historian of early photography) - from its members in England was found to compile and edit a renewed bibliography. Thus with Agfa-Gevaert (Belgium) making a grant to ESHPh in February 1995 to cover printing costs, another two double-numbered issues (No. 54/55 and 56/57) of a renewed Photohistorica covering the years 1993 and 1994 could be published.

However, with a low membership inevitable for a specialist subject area unable to provide a strong financial base, both publications (Photohistorica and PhotoResearcher) of ESHPh could not continue in the late 1990s - except that is for ESHPh member Audrey Linkman of Manchester compiling and editing a final Photohistorica (issue 58). It provided 296 abstracts of articles on the history of photography, published in serials, mainly, but not exclusively, during the half-year January to June 1997. Unlike all the earlier issues (of a square 20x20cm format), issue 58 was printed in A4 format and a new categorisation of subjects was introduced.

This account of Photohistorica is derived mainly from R. Derek Wood's preface and postscript to the issues for 1993-1994.

Current president and vice-president
Uwe Schögl, President of ESHPh since 2010; Vice-president of ESHPh from 2004 to 2010
Born 1965 in Bad Ischl, Austria, and studied at the University of Salzburg and Vienna.
Since 2002: Assistant Director and Senior Curator of Photography of the Picture Archive of the Austrian National Library, Vienna.
Since 2006: visiting lecturer at the Department for Images Sciences, Danube University Krems.
Recent publications: Ferdinand Schmutzer: Photographic Works 1894-1928 (2008) and Photo Simonis: Prominente und Werbung 1960-1970 (2010)
Dr. Ulla Fischer-Westhauser
Born in Vienna
Studies in English language and literature and history (PhD) in Vienna
Self-employed author and curator
Exhibitions and publications about history of economics and photo history.

Past presidents
2004–2008
President: Anna Auer (Vienna, Austria)
Vice-president: Uwe Schögl (Assistant Director and Senior Curator of Photography at the Picture Archive of the Austrian National Library, Vienna, Austria)
2001–2003 (provisory committee)
President: Anna Auer (Vienna, Austria)
Vice-president: Johan Swinnen (Antwerp/Brussels, Belgium)
1997–2001
President: Margaret Harker Farrand (Croydon/Surrey, UK)
Vice-president: Karl Steinorth (President of the German Society for Photography, Cologne, Germany)
1993–1997
President: Margaret Harker Farrand (Croydon/Surrey, UK)
Vice-president: Karl Steinorth (President of the Deutsche Gesellschaft für Photographie (from 1996), Cologne, Germany)
1989–1993
President: Margaret Harker Farrand (Croydon/Surrey, UK)
Vice-president: Rune Hassner (Stockholm, Sweden)
1986–1989
President: Margaret Harker Farrand (Egdean, UK)
Vice-president: Rune Hassner (Stockholm, Sweden)
1982–1986
President: Laurent Roosens (Mortsel/Antwerp, Belgium)
Vice-president: Margaret Harker (Egdean, UK)
1978–1982
President: Laurent Roosens (Mortsel/Antwerp, Belgium)
Vice-president: Margaret Harker (Egdean, UK)

Membership
Membership is open to students, private individual and to contributing international museums and institutions in photography. It incorporates interested disciplinarians from the professional scientific and academic fields where photography is significant in whole or in part.

References

External links
  ESHPh website (hosted at Donau-Uni Krems)
 Chronology of the ESHPh 1977–2008 (PDF)
 Photohistorica at Midley History of Early Photography

Arts organizations established in 1978

History organisations based in Austria
Photography organizations
History of photography
Photography magazines